Wasi may be:
Pele-Ata language (New Guinea)
Alagwa language (Tanzania)
Wasi-wari (Afghanistan)